Nicholson is a Germanic and Scottish surname. It is a patronymic form of the given name Nichol, which was a common medieval form of Nicholas.

People with the surname 

 Aideen Nicholson (1927–2019), Irish-born Canadian politician
 A. J. Nicholson (born 1983), American football linebacker
 Alexander Malcolm Nicholson (1900–1991), Canadian clergyman, farmer, and politician
 Alfred O. P. Nicholson (1808–1876), United States Senator from Tennessee
 Alistair Nicholson (born 1978), Australian rules footballer
 Anne-Marie Nicholson (born 1991), English singer and songwriter known as Anne-Marie (singer)
 Archibald Keightley Nicholson (1871–1937), British ecclesiastical stained-glass maker
 Arthur D. Nicholson, (1947–1985) U.S. Army officer
 Asenath Nicholson (1792–1855), American activist, writer and philanthropist
 Barry Nicholson (born 1978), Scottish footballer
 Ben Nicholson (1894–1982), English abstract painter (married to Winifred Nicholson)
 Bill Nicholson (disambiguation), several people
 Bob Nicholson (disambiguation), several people
 Bobby Nicholson (1918–1993), American musician and actor
 Bruce Nicholson, special effects artist
 Sir Charles Nicholson (1808–1903), British–Australian politician
 Sir Charles Nicholson, 2nd Baronet (1867–1949), British ecclesiastical architect
 Charles Ernest Nicholson, (1868–1954) British yacht designer
 Christopher Nicholson (1904–1948), British architect and designer
 Claude Nicholson (rugby league) (1892–1951), Australian rugby league footballer of the 1910s
 Claude Nicholson (British Army), (1898–1943) British Brigadier, in command of Calais during the Siege of Calais (1940)
 Danell Nicholson (born 1967), American boxer
 David Nicholson (disambiguation), several people
 Donald Nicholson (disambiguation), multiple people
 Donte Nicholson (born 1981), American NFL football player
 Ed Nicholson (1923–1987), Canadian ice hockey player
 Edward Nicholson (disambiguation), several people
 Edward Max Nicholson (1904–2003), founder of World Wildlife Fund
 Edward Williams Byron Nicholson, Bodley's Librarian
 Eliza Jane Nicholson (1843–1896), American journalist 
 Elliot Nicholson (1871–1953), English rugby union player
 Emma Nicholson, Baroness Nicholson of Winterbourne (born 1941), British politician
 Rev Ernest Nicholson (1938–2013), British biblical scholar 
 Francis Nicholson (1655–1727/8), British military officer and colonial governor
 Francis Nicholson (painter) (1753–1844), British artist
 Frank Nicholson (disambiguation), several people
 Geoff Nicholson (born 1953), British novelist and short story writer
 George Nicholson (printer) (1760–1825), British printer
 George Nicholson (footballer), English footballer
 Sir Godfrey Nicholson (1901–1991), British Conservative Party politician
 Grace Nicholson (1877–1948), American art collector and art dealer
 Harold James Nicholson (born 1950), CIA officer convicted of spying for Russia
 Henry Alleyne Nicholson (1816–1878), British paleontologist and zoologist
 Howard Nicholson (1912–2014), English physician
 J. C. Nicholson (born 1942), American judge
 Jack Nicholson (born 1937), American actor
 James W. Nicholson (1821–1887), U.S. Navy officer during Mexican–American War and Civil War
 Jim Nicholson (U.S. politician) (born 1938), United States Secretary of Veterans Affairs
 Joe Nicholson (1898–1978), English footballer
 John Nicholson (disambiguation), several people
 Joseph Hopper Nicholson (1770–1817), American lawyer, jurist, and politician from Maryland
 Joseph Shield Nicholson (1850–1927), English economist
 Joyce Nicholson (1919–2011), Australian author
 Julianne Nicholson (born 1971), American actress
 Julie Nicholson, British author and former vicar
 John Kenyon Nicholson, American playwright
 Ken Nicholson, video game developer and Windows graphics pioneer
 Kevin Nicholson (disambiguation), several people
 Leonard Nicholson (1904–1983), tenth Commissioner of the Royal Canadian Mounted Police (1951–1959)
 Lorna Schultz Nicholson, Canadian children's writer
 Lorraine Nicholson, American actress, daughter of Jack Nicholson
 Lawson Nicholson (1866–1947), Washington state pioneer, engineer, and surveyor
 Malcolm Wheeler-Nicholson (1890–1965), American pulp magazine writer and comic book pioneer
 Marjorie Nicholson (1914–1997), British activist
 Matthew Nicholson (born 1974), Australian cricketer
 Meredith Nicholson (1866–1947), American author and politician
 Meredith Merle Nicholson (1913–2005), American cinematographer
 Michael Nicholson (1937–2016), English journalist
 Montae Nicholson (born 1995), American football player
 Nancy Nicholson (1899–1977), British painter and fabric designer
 Natalie Nicholson (born 1976), American curler
 Neil Nicholson (cricketer), (English cricketer)
 Nigel Nicholson, British psychologist
 Norman Nicholson (1914–1987), English poet
 Ossie Nicholson (1906–1965), Australian cyclist
 Parson Nicholson (1863–1917), American Major League Baseball player
 Paul Nicholson (ice hockey) (born 1954), Canadian ice hockey forward
 Paul Nicholson (industrialist) (born 1938), British industrialist
 Paul Nicholson (darts player) (born 1979), English-born Australian darts player
 Peter Nicholson (architect) (1765–1844), British architect, engineer and mathematician
 Peter Nicholson (cartoonist) (born 1946), Australian political cartoonist
 Ray Nicholson (born 1992), American actor
 Reginald Nicholson (1869–1946), English politician
 Reginald F. Nicholson (1852–1939), United States Navy admiral
 Reynold A. Nicholson (1868–1945), British orientalist
 Richard Nicholson (composer) (c1570–1639), English composer
 Richard Nicholson (Paralympian) (dates unknown), Australian paralympics competitor
 Rob Nicholson (musician) (born 1969), also known as "Blasko", American rock music performer
 Rob Nicholson (born 1952), Canadian Member of Parliament
 Robert Nicholson (disambiguation), several people
 Robert Nicholson (judge), Australian jurist
 Robert Nicholson (Indian Army officer) (1745–1821), British military officer in Bombay
 Robert Nicholson (piper) (1798–1842), Northumbrian piper
 Robert B. Nicholson (1863–1917), businessman in Kalgoorlie, Western Australia
 Roscoe Nicholson (1887–1959), American surveyor and conservationist
 Ross Nicholson (born 1975), New Zealand football goalkeeper
 Roxie Nicholson (born 1950), U.S. Department of Labor welfare policy analyst
 Russ Nicholson, British illustrator
 Samuel Nicholson (disambiguation), several people
 Seth Barnes Nicholson (1891–1963), American astronomer
 Shane Nicholson (footballer) (born 1970), English footballer
 Sharon Nicholson, American climatologist
 Simon Nicholson, British painter and sculptor
 Skonk Nicholson (1917–2011), South African rugby coach 
 Stan Nicholson, rugby league footballer of the 1950s, 1960s and 1970s
 Stuart Nicholson (footballer) (1987), English footballer
 Stuart Nicholson (jazz historian) (1948), British music journalist, music critic, and academic 
 Stuart Nicholson, vocalist and song-writer with English progressive rock band Galahad (band)
 Sir Sydney Nicholson (1875–1947), English choir director, organist, composer, founder of the Royal College of Music
 Thomas Nicolson (disambiguation), several people
 Tony Nicholson (1938–1985), English cricketer
 Viv Nicholson (1936–2015), British gambling winner and tabloid target
 Wayne Nicholson, American biologist
 William Nicholson (disambiguation), several people
 Winifred Nicholson (née Roberts) (1893–1981), English painter (married to Ben Nicholson)

References

English-language surnames
German-language surnames
Patronymic surnames
Surnames from given names